Qualter is an Irish surname. Notable people with the surname include:

 Danny Qualter, Irish rugby player
 Declan Qualter, Irish hurler
 Noel Qualter, English magician
 P. J. Qualter, Irish hurler
 Séamus Qualter, Irish hurler

See also
 Qualters

Anglicised Irish-language surnames